The 83rd Infantry Division ("Thunderbolt") was a formation of the United States Army in World War I and World War II.

World War I
The division was activated in September 1917 at Camp Sherman, Ohio. It was initially made up of enlisted draftees from Ohio and Pennsylvania, with a cadre of Regular Army, Officers Reserve Corps, and National Army officers. Later groups of enlisted men assigned to the division to replace men transferred to other units came from Kentucky, Ohio, and Pennsylvania. The division went overseas in June 1918, and was designated as the 2nd Depot Division. It supplied over 195,000 officers and enlisted men as replacements to other units in France without seeing action as a complete formation. Certain divisional units saw action, such as the 332nd Infantry Regiment, in Italy (Battle of Vittorio Veneto). Its commanders were Maj. Gen. Edwin F. Glenn (25 August 1917), Brig. Gen. Frederick Perkins (13 January 1918), Brig. Gen. Willard A. Holbrook (23 March 1918), and finally Maj. Gen. Edwin F. Glenn (3 April 1918). It was demobilized in October 1919.

Order of battle

 Headquarters, 83rd Division
 165th Infantry Brigade
 329th Infantry Regiment
 330th Infantry Regiment
 323rd Machine Gun Battalion
 166th Infantry Brigade
 331st Infantry Regiment
 332nd Infantry Regiment
 324th Machine Gun Battalion
 158th Field Artillery Brigade
 322nd Field Artillery Regiment (75 mm)
 323rd Field Artillery Regiment (75 mm)
 324th Field Artillery Regiment (155 mm) 
 308th Trench Mortar Battery
 322nd Machine Gun Battalion
 308th Engineer Regiment
 308th Field Signal Battalion
 Headquarters Troop, 83rd Division
 308th Train Headquarters and Military Police
 308th Ammunition Train
 308th Supply Train
 308th Engineer Train
 308th Sanitary Train
 329th, 330th, 331st, and 332nd Ambulance Companies and Field Hospitals

Shoulder patch
The shoulder sleeve insignia of the 83rd Division insignia consists of a letters in gold spelling out the word "O-H-I-O" on a black isosceles triangular background. The insignia was selected during World War I because the division contained mostly Ohio draftees.

Interwar period

The division was reconstituted in the Organized Reserve on 24 June 1921 and assigned to the state of Ohio. The headquarters was organized on 27 September 1921.

World War II
Ordered into active military service: 15 August 1942 at Camp Atterbury, Indiana
Overseas: 6 April 1944
Campaigns: Normandy, Northern France, Rhineland, Ardennes-Alsace, Central Europe
Days of combat: 244
Distinguished Unit Citations: 7
Awards: Medal of Honor-1; Distinguished Service Cross-7; Distinguished Service Medal-1; Silver Star-710; Legion of Merit-11; Soldier's Medal-25; Bronze Star-6,294; Air Medal-110
Commanders: Maj. Gen. Frank W. Milburn (August 1942 – December 1943), Maj. Gen. Robert C. Macon (January 1944 – 31 January 1946)
Assistant Division Commanders: Brig. Gen. William C. McMahon (August 1942 - December 1942), Brig. Gen. Claude B. Ferenbaugh (January 1944 - May 1945)
Commanding Officers Artillery: Brig. Gen. Robert M. Montague (August 1942 - February 1946)
Returned to U.S.: 26 March 1946
Inactivated: 5 April 1946

Order of battle

 Headquarters, 83rd Infantry Division
 329th Infantry Regiment
 330th Infantry Regiment
 331st Infantry Regiment
 Headquarters and Headquarters Battery, 83rd Infantry Division Artillery
 322nd Field Artillery Battalion (105 mm) 
 323rd Field Artillery Battalion (105 mm)
 324th Field Artillery Battalion (155 mm)
 908th Field Artillery Battalion (105 mm)
 308th Engineer Combat Battalion
 308th Medical Battalion
 83rd Cavalry Reconnaissance Troop (Mechanized)
 Headquarters, Special Troops, 83rd Infantry Division
 Headquarters Company, 83rd Infantry Division
 783rd Ordnance Light Maintenance Company
 83rd Quartermaster Company
 83rd Signal Company
 Military Police Platoon
 Band
 83rd Counterintelligence Corps Detachment
453rd Anti Aircraft Artillery Battalion Detachment

Combat chronicle
The 83rd Infantry Division, commanded by Major General Robert C. Macon, arrived in England on 16 April 1944 with its first divisional headquarters at Keele Hall in Staffordshire. After training in Wales, the division, taking part in the Allied invasion of Normandy, landed at Omaha Beach, 18 June 1944, and entered the hedgerow struggle south of Carentan, 27 June. Taking the offensive, the 83rd reached the St. Lo-Periers Road, 25 July, and advanced  against strong opposition as the Normandy Campaign ended.

After a period of training, elements of the division took Châteauneuf-d'Ille-et-Vilaine, 5 August, and Dinard, 15 August, and approached the heavily fortified area protecting St. Malo. Intense fighting during the Battle of Saint-Malo reduced enemy strong points and a combined attack against the Citadel Fortress of St. Servan caused its surrender, 17 August. While elements moved south to protect the north bank of the Loire River, the main body of the division concentrated south of Rennes for patrolling and reconnaissance activities. Elements reduced the garrison at Ile de Cézembre, which surrendered, 2 September. On 16 September 1944: in the only surrender of a German Major General to U.S. troops, Botho Henning Elster surrendered with 18,850 men and 754 officers at the Loire bridge of Beaugency. The movement into Luxembourg was completed on 25 September. Taking Remich on the 28th and patrolling defensively along the Moselle, the 83d resisted counterattacks and advanced to the Siegfried Line defenses across the Sauer after capturing Grevenmacher and Echternach, 7 October. As the initial movement in operation "Unicorn," the division took Le Stromberg Hill in the vicinity of Basse Konz against strong opposition, 5 November, and beat off counterattacks.

Moving to the Hurtgen Forest, the 83rd Division thrust forward from Gressenich to the west bank of the Roer. It entered the Battle of the Bulge, 27 December, striking at Rochefort and reducing the enemy salient in a bitter struggle. The division moved back to Belgium and the Netherlands for rehabilitation and training, 22 January 1945. On 1 March, the 83rd Division advanced toward the Rhine in Operation Grenade, and captured Neuss. The west bank of the Rhine from north of Oberkassel to the Erft Canal was cleared and defensive positions established by 2 March and the division renewed its training. The 83rd Division crossed the Rhine south of Wesel, 29 March, and advanced across the Munster Plain to the Weser, crossing it at Bodenwerder. The division crossed the Leine, 8 April, and attacked to the east, pushing over the Harz Mountain region and advancing to the Elbe at Barby. That city was taken on 13 April. The 83rd Division established a bridgehead over the river.

On 11 April 1945 the 83rd Division encountered Langenstein-Zwieberge, a subcamp of the Buchenwald concentration camp.
At the camp, the troops found approximately 1,100 inmates. The inmates were malnourished and in extremely poor physical condition. The 83rd Division reported the death rate at the camp had been 500 per month. Also, that the prisoners had been forced to work 16-hour days in nearby mines, and were shot if they became too weak to work. After liberation, the death rate continued at approximately 25–50 people per day, due to the severe physical debilitation of the prisoners.

To slow the spread of sickness and death, the 83rd Division ordered the local German mayor to supply the camp with food and water. Also, medical supplies were requisitioned from the U.S. Army's 20th Field Hospital. In addition, the 83rd Division recovered documents for use by war crimes investigators.

Casualties
Total battle casualties: 15,910
Killed in action: 3,161
Wounded in action: 11,807
Missing in action: 279
Prisoner of war: 663

Assignments in ETO
8 April 1944: VIII Corps, Third Army
25 June 1944: Third Army, but attached to the VIII Corps of First Army
1 July 1944: VII Corps
15 July 1944: VIII Corps
1 August 1944: XV Corps, Third Army, 12th Army Group
3 August 1944: VIII Corps
5 September 1944: VIII Corps, Ninth Army, 12th Army Group
10 September 1944: Ninth Army, 12th Army Group
21 September 1944: Third Army, 12th Army Group
11 October 1944: VIII Corps, Ninth Army, 12th Army Group
22 October 1944: VIII Corps, First Army, 12th Army Group
8 November 1944: Third Army, 12th Army Group
11 November 1944: VIII Corps, First Army, 12th Army Group
7 December 1944: VII Corps
20 December 1944: Attached, with the entire First Army, to the 21st Army Group
22 December 1944: XIX Corps, Ninth Army (attached to the British 21st Army Group)
26 December 1944: VII Corps, First Army (attached to British 21st Army Group), 12th Army Group
16 February 1945: XIX Corps, Ninth Army, 12th Army Group
8 May 1945: XIII Corps

The Rag-Tag Circus
During the rush to the Elbe river, wartime correspondents nicknamed the 83rd "The Rag-Tag Circus" due to its resourceful commander, Major General Robert C. Macon, ordering the supplementing of the division's transport with anything that moved, "no questions asked".

The 83rd moved as fast as an armored task force in an assortment of hurriedly repainted captured German vehicles: Wehrmacht kubelwagens, staff cars, ammunition trucks, Panzers, motor bikes, buses, a concrete mixer, and two fire engines. Every enemy unit or town that surrendered or was captured subscribed its quota of rolling stock for the division, usually at gunpoint. These newly-acquired vehicles were quickly painted olive-green and fitted with a U.S. star before joining the 83rd. The division even seized and flew a German Bf 109.

From the air the column bore no resemblance to either an armored or an infantry division. But for a number of U.S Army trucks interspersed among its columns, it might easily have been mistaken for a German convoy.

U.S. Army Reserve Readiness Training Center
The 83rd United States Army Reserve Readiness Training Center trains soldiers in leader, functional, and DMOSQ programs.

Nicknames
Nicknames: Thunderbolt Division, The Rag-Tag-Circus and the Ohio Division.

See also
Tony Vaccaro, a war photographer of the 83rd Infantry Division.
Rick Fletcher, a war photographer of the 83rd Infantry Division.

References
 
 1944: Botho Henning Elster (German Wikipedia) – a surrender at Beaugency

Notes

References

Further reading

External links
The Thunderbolt Across Europe
Fact Sheet of the 83rd Infantry Division from battleofthebulge.org
United States Holocaust Memorial Museum recognition of the 83rd as a "liberator" of the camps
83rd Infantry Division documents
Army 83rd Infantry Division - WW II in Europe (video)

083
Infantry Division, U.S. 083
083
083
1917 establishments in Ohio
United States Army divisions of World War I
Infantry divisions of the United States Army in World War II